The Sumerian disputation or Sumerian debate is a topical short story created in the middle-to-late 3rd millennium BC. Seven major debates are known, with specific titles.

The list of the majority of the known debates is as follows (from Kramer):

(alphabetical)

–Debate between bird and fish
–Debate between cattle and grain
–Debate between the millstone and the gulgul-stone
–Debate between the pickaxe and the plough (translation)
–Debate between silver and mighty copper (translation)
–Debate between Summer and Winter
–Debate between tree and the reed

Additionally, four compositions of the disputation type with the Sumerian school, and its graduates or teachers:

–The Disputation between Enkmansi and Girnishag
–The Colloquy between an ungula and a Scribe
–The Disputation between Enkitalu and Enkihegal
–Disputation between Two School Graduates

An additional text concerns women:

–Disputation between two unnamed ladies

References

Kramer, 1963. The Sumerians: Their History, Culture and Character, Samuel Noah Kramer, c 1963, The University of Chicago Press, Chapter 5, Literature: The Sumerian Belles-Lettres, pp. 165–228; Disputation literature, pp. 217–228.

External links

Disputations or Literary Debates, at Gateway to Babylon

 
Rhetoric
Sumerian language